Apolonio Castillo Díaz (23 May 1921 – 11 March 1957) was a Mexican swimmer who competed in the 1948 Summer Olympics and 1952 Summer Olympics in butterfly stroke. 
Castillo was a close friend of Ramón Bravo, he taught the photographer and underwater filmmaker to dive.

In the last search Castillo floated but suffered a decompression accident and three days later he was taken to the hyperbaric chamber of the Naval Base, where at dawn on March 11, 1957, the great Polo Castillo ceased to exist.

References

1921 births
1957 deaths
Mexican male swimmers
Sportspeople from Guerrero
Mexican male breaststroke swimmers
Olympic swimmers of Mexico
Swimmers at the 1948 Summer Olympics
Competitors at the 1946 Central American and Caribbean Games
Central American and Caribbean Games gold medalists for Mexico
Central American and Caribbean Games medalists in swimming